Deaver is a town in Big Horn County, Wyoming, United States. The population was 178 at the 2010 census.

Geography
Deaver is located at  (44.890439, −108.596860).

Climate

According to the Köppen Climate Classification system, Deaver has a cold desert climate, abbreviated "BWk" on climate maps.

Demographics

2010 census
As of the census of 2010, there were 178 people, 66 households, and 48 families residing in the town. The racial makeup of the town was 96.6% White, 2.8% from other races, and 0.6% from two or more races. Hispanic or Latino of any race were 6.7% of the population.

There were 66 households, of which 37.9% had children under the age of 18 living with them, 62.1% were married couples living together, 4.5% had a female householder with no husband present, 6.1% had a male householder with no wife present, and 27.3% were non-families. 18.2% of all households were made up of individuals, and 3% had someone living alone who was 65 years of age or older. The average household size was 2.70 and the average family size was 3.08.

The median age in the town was 39 years. 26.4% of residents were under the age of 18; 10.7% were between the ages of 18 and 24; 19.6% were from 25 to 44; 33.8% were from 45 to 64; and 9.6% were 65 years of age or older. The gender makeup of the town was 53.4% male and 46.6% female.

2000 census
As of the census of 2000, there were 177 people, 65 households, and 44 families residing in the town. The population density was 174.0 people per square mile (67.0/km2). There were 80 housing units at an average density of 78.7 per square mile (30.3/km2). The racial makeup of the town was 94.92% White, 1.13% Native American, 2.82% from other races, and 1.13% from two or more races. Hispanic or Latino of any race were 8.47% of the population.

There were 65 households, out of which 46.2% had children under the age of 18 living with them, 60.0% were married couples living together, 4.6% had a female householder with no husband present, and 32.3% were non-families. 26.2% of all households were made up of individuals, and 9.2% had someone living alone who was 65 years of age or older. The average household size was 2.72 and the average family size was 3.34.

In the town, the population was spread out, with 35.0% under the age of 18, 6.8% from 18 to 24, 32.2% from 25 to 44, 17.5% from 45 to 64, and 8.5% who were 65 years of age or older. The median age was 30 years. For every 100 females, there were 110.7 males. For every 100 females age 18 and over, there were 101.8 males.

The median income for a household in the town was $31,071, and the median income for a family was $34,063. Males had a median income of $31,563 versus $15,938 for females. The per capita income for the town was $14,134. About 14.0% of families and 10.4% of the population were below the poverty line, including 6.3% of those under the age of eighteen and none of those 65 or over.

Education
Public education in Deaver is provided by Big Horn County School District Number 1. The district operates Rocky Mountain Middle/High School in Cowley, and Rocky Mountain Elementary School in Cowley.

Deaver  has a public library, a branch of the Big Horn County Library System.

References

Towns in Big Horn County, Wyoming
Towns in Wyoming